Trofankovo is a rural locality (a village) in Nikolo-Ramenskoye Rural Settlement, Cherepovetsky District, Vologda Oblast, Russia. The population was 12 as of 2022.

Geography 
Trofankovo is located 76 km southwest of Cherepovets (the district's administrative centre) by road. Kunshino is the nearest rural locality.

References 

Rural localities in Cherepovetsky District